Pimenta odiolens is a species of plant in the family Myrtaceae. It is endemic to Cuba.  It is threatened by habitat loss.

References

Endemic flora of Cuba
odiolens
Vulnerable plants
Taxonomy articles created by Polbot